More of Our Stupid Noise was a Canadian compilation album, originally released on Squirtgun Records. It was subsequently rereleased in 1998 on Nettwerk with the title More of Our Stupid Noise '98, with an altered track order and a few different songs.

One of the album's most noted characteristics was that in addition to a song by Eric's Trip, it also included a song by each individual Eric's Trip member's own side project.

A sequel album, Return of Our Stupid Noise, was released in 2015 to mark Squirtgun's 20th anniversary.

1996 track listing

 Shortfall, "Drive"
 hHead, "Want"
 Scratching Post, "Full Throttle"
 Treble Charger, "Bubble and Star (Here's Where the Guitars Come In)"
 Radioblaster, "Comfy New You"
 Versus, "Forest Fire"
 Speedbuggy, "Bionica"
 Poledo, "Herskin"
 Lou Barlow, "Blown Pony"
 Elevator to Hell, "Veins/Green"
 Noah's Arkweld, "Xfriend"
 Moon Socket, "Almost Spring"
 The New Grand, "Yours Truly"
 Orange Glass, "Feel 500"
 Thee Suddens, "A Rhyme That No One Understands"
 Purple Knight, "Fireball 500"
 Hip Club Groove, "16 Jabs"
 Eric's Trip, "So Easier Last Time"
 Squirrel, "Superforgettor"
 Julie Doiron (credited as Broken Girl), "So Fast"
 Hayden, "A Fortune I'd Kept"
 Len, "Making Our Dreams Come True" (a cover of the Laverne and Shirley theme song)

1998 track listing

 Bionic, "C'mon C'Mon"
 Shortfall, "Drive"
 Scratching Post, "Full Throttle"
 Radioblaster, "Perfect Burn"
 The Ids, "Pain and Beauty"
 Lou Barlow, "Blown Pony"
 Mystery Machine, "What I Want"
 Elevator to Hell, "Veins/Green"
 Poledo, "Herskin"
 hHead, "Want"
 Speedbuggy, "Bionica"
 By Divine Right, "Bigfoot"
 Squirrel, "superforgettor"
 Versus, "Forest Fire"
 Julie Doiron, "So Fast"
 Hayden, "A Fortune I'd Kept"
 Moon Socket, "Almost Spring"
 Hip Club Groove, "Guaranteed"
 The Suddens, "A Rhyme That No One Understands"
 Orange Glass, "Feel 500"
 Eric's Trip, "So Easier Last Time"
 Len, "Trillion Daze"
 The Bonaduces, "You're So Lame When You're Drunk"
 The New Grand, "Yours Truly"
 Noah's Arkweld, "Xfriend"

References

Compilation albums by Canadian artists
1996 compilation albums